Tayster and Rojac Records was a record label run by Fat Jack Taylor out of Harlem World from 1979 until 1984. They recorded Lovebug Starski's first single produced by David MacDonald nicknamed "Mighty Whitey".

The label specialized in Hip Hop, specifically rap, and just as it was breaking out. Artists on the label included Harlem World Crew and Lady Smiley.

See also 
 List of record labels

External links
 David MacDonald's site

American record labels
Record labels established in 1979
Record labels disestablished in 1984
Hip hop record labels